Åsa Elisabeth Eriksson (born 1972) is a Swedish politician, trade unionist and member of the Riksdag, the national legislature. A member of the Social Democratic Party, she has represented Västmanland County since March 2018. She had previously been a substitute member of the Riksdag three times: August 2016 to April 2017 (for Olle Thorell); October 2017 to March 2018 (for Anna Wallén); and March 2018 (for Anna Wallén).

Eriksson is the daughter of teachers Björn Eriksson and Anna-Britta Eriksson (née Sjögren). She has a teaching degree from the Uppsala University. She has been a member of the municipal council in Norberg Municipality since 2011.

References

1972 births
Living people
Members of the Riksdag 2014–2018
Members of the Riksdag 2018–2022
Members of the Riksdag 2022–2026
Members of the Riksdag from the Social Democrats
People from Norberg Municipality
Uppsala University alumni
Women members of the Riksdag
21st-century Swedish women politicians